The United Workers' Party may refer to:

Polish United Workers' Party
United Workers' Party (Dominica)
United Workers Party (Guyana)
United Workers Party (Israel), commonly known as Mapam
United Workers Party (Saint Lucia)
United Workers Party (United States)

Political party disambiguation pages